Aellen's roundleaf bat (Hipposideros marisae) is a species of bat in the family Hipposideridae. It is found in Ivory Coast, Guinea, and Liberia. Its natural habitats are subtropical and tropical forests and caves.

Taxonomy and etymology
It was described as a new species in 1954 by Villy Aellen. The eponym for the species name "marisae" was Aellen's wife (her name was presumably Marisa). Of the name, Aellen wrote, "Dédiée à ma femme qui m'a accompagné et secondé au cours de ce voyage," which translates to: "Dedicated to my wife who accompanied and assisted me on this trip."

Description
It has long ears. Its fur is uniformly dark gray, while its ears and wing membranes are dark brown. Its nose-leaf is black around the edges, with a light brown sella.

Range and habitat
It is known from several countries in West Africa, including Ivory Coast, Guinea, and Liberia.

Conservation
It is currently evaluated as vulnerable by the IUCN.

References

External links
Images of this species

Hipposideros
Mammals described in 1954
Taxonomy articles created by Polbot
Bats of Africa